Acaulospora foveata is a species of fungus in the family Acaulosporaceae. It forms arbuscular mycorrhiza and vesicles in roots. Found in Mexico in soil associated with sugarcane (Saccharum officinarum), the species was described as new to science in 1982.

References

Diversisporales
Fungi of Mexico
Fungi described in 1982
Fungi without expected TNC conservation status